The Pacific shrew (Sorex pacificus) is a species of mammal in the family Soricidae. It is endemic to western Oregon in the United States.
The Pacific Shrew is native to western Oregon, more specifically from the Siltcoos lake to the coast going from the border line of Douglas and Lane counties continuing south to the northern parts of California. The first documented Pacific shrew to be caught was found at the mouth of the Umpqua River in 1858. They are normally found in damp areas along creeks in forests and sometimes near collapsed trees. Their refuge is of the utmost importance and they are seldom found far from it. This includes collapsed trees or dense vegetation. They use the flora to build a nest, gathering small plants such as grass, moss, lichen, or leaves into a pile and pushing themselves into the middle.

Description
They are the largest brown shrew in western Oregon. In the summer time they have short, red-tinted brown hair, which gets longer and darker moving into the colder seasons. Their feet and tails are usually a tan color with the possibility of being brown. Sometimes older shrews will have dark tips to their tails. Like their fur, their incisor teeth have a reddish brown tint on the tips.

Hunting and prey
The Pacific shrew goes hunting and much of their prey is actually treacherous to them. They find their prey with their excellent hearing and sense of smell. They will jump into the air to catch flying prey and dig underground after food.  Their prey includes: slugs, snails, earthworms, centipedes, millipedes, scorpions, and various insects. In general they will paralyze their prey, but if they are in danger, for example with a wasp, they will kill it immediately. When prey is captured they will either eat it right where it was killed or store it near their nest.

Population and conservation
Not much is known about the population of the Pacific Shrew, but they are not a rare sight. It is very likely that their numbers are more than 10,000. In all likelihood, their population size has not decreased over twenty five percent over a long period of time. According to the International Union of Conservation of Nature (IUCN) they are of least concern. They are doing very well in numbers. This might be because there have been no major threats recognized. They are nocturnal so their main predators are owls, but they have been known to be caught by salamanders. Although they are not threatened there are safe places for them to live such as the Crater Lake national park and other state parks.

References

2. Maser, Chris. "Pacific Shrew." Mammals of the Pacific Northwest: From the Coast to the High Cascades. Corvallis, OR: Oregon State UP, 1998. 30–37. Print.

3. "Sorex Pacificus ." Sorex Pacificus (Pacific Shrew). International Union of Conservation of Nature and Natural Resources, n.d. Web. 26 Jan. 2017.

Sorex
Natural history of Oregon
Taxonomy articles created by Polbot
Mammals described in 1877
Mammals of Oregon